Shawan, also transliterated from Chinese to Uyghur as Savan, is a county-level city situated in the north of the Xinjiang Uyghur Autonomous Region  under the administration of the Tacheng Prefecture. The Postcode is 832100.

Transport 
China National Highway 312

Administrative divisions 
Town (镇)
Sandaohezi (Sadawkhuza) (三道河子镇, سەندوخوزا بازىرى) | Sidaohezi (Sidawkhuza) (四道河子镇, سىداۋخۇزا بازىرى ) |  Laoshawan (老沙湾镇, كونا ساۋەن بازىرى)  |  Wulanwusu (Ulan'us) (乌兰乌苏镇, ئۇلان ئۇس بازىرى) | Anjihai (Yansikhay) (安集海镇, يەنسىخەي بازىرى) | Dongwan (东湾镇, دۇڭۋەن بازىرى) |  Sigebi (西戈壁镇, شىگوبى بازىرى)| Liumaowan (柳毛湾镇, ليۇماۋۋەن بازىرى) | Jingouhe (金沟河镇, جىنگوۋخې)
Township (乡)
Shanghudi Township (商户地乡, شاڭخۇدى يېزىسى) | Daquan Township (大泉乡, داچۇەن يېزىسى) | Boertonggu Township (博尔通古乡, بورتۈڭگى يېزىسى)
Others
Cattle Circle Ranch (牛圈子牧场) | Boertonggu Ranch (博尔通古牧场) |  Shawanxian Pedigree Ranch (沙湾县良种场)| XPCC 121st Brigade 兵团121团 (121-تۇەن مەيدانى) | XPCC 122nd Brigade 兵团122团 (122-تۇەن مەيدانى) | XPCC 123rd Brigade 兵团123团 (123-تۇەن مەيدانى) | XPCC 123rd Brigade 兵团133团 (133-تۇەن مەيدانى) | XPCC 134th Brigade 兵团134团 (134-تۇەن مەيدانى) | XPCC 135th Brigade 兵团135团 (135-تۇەن مەيدانى) | XPCC 141st Brigade 兵团141团 (141-تۇەن مەيدانى) | XPCC 142nd Brigade 兵团142团 (142-تۇەن مەيدانى) | XPCC 143rd Brigade 兵团143团 (143-تۇەن مەيدانى) | XPCC 144th Brigade 兵团144团 (144-تۇەن مەيدانى) | XPCC 151st Brigade 兵团151团 (151-تۇەن مەيدانى)

Climate

References

County-level divisions of Xinjiang
Tacheng Prefecture
Populated places in Xinjiang